Expensive Hobby (1971–2003) was an outstanding Quarter Horse reining horse, working cowhorse, and cutting horse.

Expensive Hobby was a 1971 buckskin gelding, sired by Hobby Horse, and out of a daughter of Stormy's Sugar named Jan's Helen.

Expensive Hobby was shown in reining 120 times, and won the class 110 of those times. He won the American Quarter Horse Association, or AQHA, World Show Champion title in working cowhorse and reining in 1979. He was retired in 1983, but came out of retirement briefly, but was eventually retired again, before dying at age 32 in 2003.

Expensive Hobby was inducted into the American Quarter Horse Association's (or AQHA) AQHA Hall of Fame in 2007.

Notes

References

External links
 Expensive Hobby at Quarter Horse Directory
 Expensive Hobby Pedigree at All Breed Pedigree
 Expensive Hobby at Quarter Horse Legends

Cutting horses
1971 animal births
2003 animal deaths
AQHA Hall of Fame (horses)